Cristian Ezequiel Canuhé (born August 25, 1987, in Toay, Argentina) is an Argentine footballer currently playing for All Boys of the Argentine Primera B Nacional.

Teams
  Defensa y Justicia 2008-2010
  Audax Italiano 2010–2015
  Atlético de Rafaela 2013-2014 (loan)
  San Martín de San Juan 2015
  Temperley 2016
  All Boys 2016-2018
  Alvarado 2018-2019
  Ferro Carril Oeste 2020-2021
  Deportivo Madryn 2021
  All Boys 2021

Personal
Canuhé is of Mapuche descent.

References

External links
 Profile at BDFA 

1987 births
Living people
Argentine people of Mapuche descent
People from La Pampa Province
Argentine footballers
Argentine expatriate footballers
Defensa y Justicia footballers
Audax Italiano footballers
Atlético de Rafaela footballers
San Martín de San Juan footballers
Club Atlético Temperley footballers
All Boys footballers
Primera Nacional players
Argentine Primera División players
Chilean Primera División players
Torneo Argentino A players
Torneo Argentino B players
Argentine expatriate sportspeople in Chile
Expatriate footballers in Chile
Association football midfielders
Mapuche sportspeople
Indigenous sportspeople of the Americas